Eucharassus nisseri is a species of beetle in the family Cerambycidae. It was described by Per Olof Christopher Aurivillius in 1891.

References

Necydalopsini
Beetles described in 1891